Sonche District is one of twenty-one districts of the province Chachapoyas in Peru.

References

1954 establishments in Peru
States and territories established in 1954
Districts of the Chachapoyas Province
Districts of the Amazonas Region